Ferragudo is a halt on the Algarve Line in the Lagoa municipality, Portugal. It was opened on the 15th of February 1903, under the name Portimão. After the construction and opening of the Portimão Railway Bridge and station, in 1922, the name was changed to Ferragudo.

Services
This halt is used by regional trains, operated by Comboios de Portugal.

References

Railway stations in Portugal
Railway stations opened in 1903